Chlidichthys johnvoelckeri, the cerise dottyback, is a species of fish in the family Pseudochromidae.

Description

Distribution and habitat
Chlidichthys johnvoelckeri is found in the Western part of the Indian Ocean, from Tanzania and Mozambique to the Comoros.

Etymology
In 1954 the fish was named by Smith in honor of John Voelcker (1898-1968), a prominent amateur ornithologist in Johannesburg, South Africa.

References

Smith, M.M., 1986. Pseudochromidae. p. 539-541. In M.M. Smith and P.C. Heemstra (eds.) Smiths' sea fishes. Springer-Verlag, Berlin. 

Pseudoplesiopinae
Taxa named by J. L. B. Smith
Fish described in 1954